Hormoaning is an EP by the American rock band Nirvana. It was released on January 27, 1992 through DGC Records and Geffen Records. It was released in Australia and Japan only, during the band's tour there.

Songs
Four of the songs on Hormoaning are covers which had not been released previously. The remaining two songs are Nirvana originals which previously appeared as b-sides to singles for Nevermind.

"Aneurysm" and "Even in His Youth", two Nirvana originals produced and engineered by Craig Montgomery, also appear as b-sides on the "Smells Like Teen Spirit" single. This version of "Aneurysm" later appeared on disc two of the rarities box set With the Lights Out in 2004 and is different from the version released on Incesticide in 1992.

The other four songs are from a Peel Session, recorded for BBC Radio on October 21, 1990. "Turnaround" (originally by Devo), "Son of a Gun" and "Molly's Lips" (originally by The Vaselines) appear on the Incesticide album. "D-7" is a cover of the Wipers song and appears on the UK version of the "Lithium" single and later on disc 2 of With the Lights Out in 2004.

Release and reception

In Australia, 15,000 official copies were released: 4,000 on burgundy 12" vinyl, 10,000 on CD, and 1,000 on cassette. There were two different pressings of the Australian CD, one with a silver CD and one with a blue CD. In Japan it was released on CD in large quantities. The Australian and Japanese releases have entirely different artwork. The Australian version is considered rare due to the limited numbers. There were only two official Japanese pressings, both on CD with barely noticeable variations in artwork. The Japanese CDs were rushed out without prior consent from the US parent company and as a result the cover art is taken from the inside artwork of the Nevermind album. All Japanese vinyl copies were counterfeit. Counterfeit versions of the Japanese CDs also exist and the Australian blue CD version has also been counterfeited. The Australian silver CD is the only official version of which counterfeit copies are not known to exist.

In a contemporary review for The Village Voice, Robert Christgau gave Hormoaning an "A−" and found it almost as good as their second album, Nevermind (1991), and far superior to their first record, Bleach (1989), particularly because "without David Grohl they're sludge monkeys". He named it the 33rd best album of 1992 in his list for the Pazz & Jop, an annual poll of American critics published by The Village Voice. In a retrospective review, AllMusic's Steve Bekkala gave the EP four out of five stars and called it "a revealing entry in the catalog of the most influential rock band of the '90s".

Hormoaning was officially re-released on Record Store Day (April 16, 2011) as a 12" vinyl. Only 6,000 unnumbered copies were released.

Track listing

Personnel
Nirvana
Kurt Cobain – guitar, vocals
Krist Novoselic – bass guitar
Dave Grohl – drums

Production
Mike Engles – engineering on "Turnaround", "D-7", "Son of a Gun", and "Molly's Lips"
Dale Griffin – production on "Turnaround", "D-7", "Son of a Gun", and "Molly's Lips"
Fred Kay – engineer on "Turnaround", "D-7", "Son of a Gun", and "Molly's Lips"
Craig Montgomery – production, engineer on "Aneurysm" and "Even in His Youth"
Andy Wallace – mixing on "Aneurysm" and "Even in His Youth"

Charts

1992 original release

2011 Record Store Day re-release

Release history
The following table shows the release history of official releases of Hormoaning.

See also
Whores Moaning

References

External links 
 

1992 EPs
Peel Sessions recordings
Record Store Day releases
Nirvana (band) EPs
DGC Records EPs
Geffen Records EPs
Albums produced by Dale Griffin